"Love Will Never Do (Without You)" is a song by American singer Janet Jackson. Composed by songwriters and record producers Jimmy Jam and Terry Lewis, it was recorded for the singer's fourth studio album, Janet Jackson's Rhythm Nation 1814 (1989). As with all tracks for the album, recording took place at Lewis and Jam's Flyte Tyme Studios in Minneapolis, Minnesota. The song was released as the seventh commercial single from the album on October 2, 1990, by A&M Records. It topped the US Billboard Hot 100 singles chart in 1991, becoming the fifth number one hit of Jackson's career and the fourth number one single from Rhythm Nation 1814. This gave her the distinction of being the only recording artist in the history of the chart to have seven commercial singles from one album peak within the top five positions, surpassing a record held by Michael Jackson and Bruce Springsteen. She also became the third woman in the chart's history to amass four number one hits from one album, following Paula Abdul and Whitney Houston. Additionally, Jackson became the first artist to achieve Hot 100 number one hits from a single album across three separate calendar years, preceded by "Escapade" and "Black Cat" in 1990 and "Miss You Much" in 1989. The single also peaked with the top five position of the US Hot R&B/Hip-Hop Songs and Dance Club Songs charts, as well as becoming a top 40 hit across several international singles charts. It is certified gold by the Recording Industry Association of America (RIAA), denoting sales of 500,000 units in the US alone.

Lyrically, "Love Will Never Do (Without You)" speaks of love conquering all, despite negative perceptions about a tumultuous relationship. Jimmy Jam and Terry Lewis originally conceived the song as a duet, potentially featuring male vocalists such as their former employer Prince, or former New Edition members Johnny Gill or Ralph Tresvant. Jackson ultimately recorded the song solo, singing alternate verses in different octaves to simulate a duet. Music critics have praised the song as one of the highlights of Rhythm Nation 1814, with reviews focusing on the execution of Jackson's layered vocals and harmonies. Although released as a single in 1990, Pitchfork included it on their list of "The 200 Best Songs of the 1980s."

A music video directed by Herb Ritts and featuring actors Antonio Sabàto Jr. and Djimon Hounsou was produced to promote the single. In contrast to Jackson's typical videography where she is part of a dancing troupe, the cinematography utilizes a minimalist aesthetic, absent of back-up dancers and elaborate choreography. Jackson, Sabàto Jr., and Hounsou appear along a desert landscape, with a visual emphasis on bare skin and physical intimacy. The video is frequently regarded as the first instance in which Jackson takes on a sexually mature persona, setting the tone for her future projects. Critical analysis in film, feminist and queer theory also examine the video's use of the female gaze through which Sabàto Jr. and Hounsou's bodies are given equal focus. It won the MTV Video Music Award for Best Female Video at the 1991 MTV Video Music Awards and appears on the 100 all-time greatest music videos lists produced by MTV, Rolling Stone and VH1. It has been cited as an influence in the videography of other artists such as Britney Spears and Nicole Scherzinger.

Beginning with the Janet World Tour in 1993, Jackson has performed "Love Will Never Do (Without You)" live in each of her concert tours. She also included the song in the setlist for her first Las Vegas regency show, Janet Jackson: Metamorphosis. In 2001, a cover of the song was performed live by Macy Gray in tribute to Jackson as part of the television special MTV Icon, celebrating the singer. Covers have also been recorded by Sally Yeh and Sahara Hotnights. The song appears on two of Jackson's greatest hits compilations, Design of a Decade: 1986–1996 (1995) and Number Ones (2009).

Background and composition
Jimmy Jam and Terry Lewis considered the idea of making this song a duet. According to Fred Bronson's The Billboard Book of Number 1 Hits, they thought about possibly getting Prince, Johnny Gill, Ralph Tresvant, or someone else working with them at the time. However, there was no concrete plan. During the recording of the first verse, Jimmy Jam told Jackson, "Sing it low like some guy would sing it." As a result, they kept the idea of her singing the first verse in a low octave but go an octave up on the second verse.

In 1996, the song was remixed by Roger Sanchez. The Single Edit was included on the international release of Jackson's 1995 greatest-hits compilation Design of a Decade: 1986–1996. Although being one of the album's last singles, it was one of the first songs recorded for Janet Jackson's Rhythm Nation 1814. The song's background vocals were recorded in late 1988, while Jackson recorded the lead vocals in January 1989. Herb Alpert plays trumpet on the track.

"Love Will Never Do" is written in the key of A major and has a tempo of 103 beats per minute in common time. Jackson's vocals span from F3 to C6 in the song.

Critical reception
Andy Healy from Albumism noted that "the slinky bassline" of "Love Will Never Do (Without You)" "seduces with ease as Jackson sings about the desire for a fulfilling love, even one against the odds." He added further, "With a shimmering arrangement beneath her, Jackson delivers one of her finest moments on record. Often characterized as having a whispering vocal, here Jackson sings with strength and confidence and layers the song in lush backing harmonies that glisten with every passing line." Larry Flick from Billboard wrote, "Here's yet one more sparkling gem from La Jackson's bejeweled "Rhythm Nation 1814" epic. This time, she strikes a sexy swing-funk pose". A reviewer from Music & Media described it as "a suspenseful, sparsely arranged dance-floor track sporting some great vocals and subtle licks."

Chart performance
The song became Jackson's fifth number-one single on the Billboard Hot 100, and the final of seven top five singles from the album, making her the only artist to achieve seven top five singles from one album. On the Radio & Records Airplay chart the song debuted at #24 on the November 23, 1990, issue, after four weeks it reached #1 staying at the top of the chart for three weeks and staying on the top 10 for seven weeks, the single remained on the chart for twelve weeks. The success of "Love Will Never Do (Without You)" also helped the album to become the first in history to produce number-one hits on the Billboard Hot 100 in three separate calendar years, those being "Miss You Much" in 1989, "Escapade" and "Black Cat" in 1990, and "Love Will Never Do (Without You)" in 1991.

The single was certified Gold by the RIAA, but achieved even greater airplay success, topping the Airplay Hot 100 for seven consecutive weeks, becoming the longest-running  airplay number one single at the time.

Music video
The accompanying video was directed by American photographer Herb Ritts, and choreographed by Ritts, Jackson and Tina Landon on September 13, 1990. Jackson originally planned to wear a dress for the video, but Ritts envisioned Jackson in nothing more than a black top, a pair of jeans, and light brown hair. The video features cameos by actors Antonio Sabàto Jr. and Djimon Hounsou. Ritts commented,
"Because Janet is known for her instinctive talent for dance, as well as being an all around entertainer, Janet and I decided to try something innovative on the video. The video is a departure from her elaborate dance production routines and focuses, instead, on her alone, She is fresh, sensual, womanly and vulnerable as she reveals herself to the camera. We wanted to show this intimate and more personal side of Janet".
The video begins with the shadows of Jackson and a dancer, leading to images of a man running through a desert. As she starts singing the song, accompanied by her love interest, a man doing stunts also appears. As the video advances, a black man is seen running in a large wheel, and also begins lip-synching to the song. He then appears on top of a white half circle. The video ends with Jackson sharing caresses with her lover. Calvin Thomas on his book Masculinity, Psychoanalysis, Straight Queer Theory noted a lightening of Jackson's skin tone and a notable transformation of the shape of her body in the music video. Two versions of the video were produced, one in black-and-white, and the other colorized, both of which appear on the Design of a Decade: 1986–1996 video compilation.

The video won for Best Female Video and was nominated for Best Choreography and Best Art Direction at the 1991 MTV Video Music Awards. It ranked 13 on Rolling Stones The 100 Top Music Videos, 72 on VH1's 100 Greatest Videos, and 88 on MTV's 100 Greatest Videos Ever Made. Britney Spears was inspired by the video for her "Don't Let Me Be the Last to Know" clip, saying "he did Janet Jackson-remember when she made her comeback?" she says, alluding to Janet's makeover, which was orchestrated by Ritts when he directed her "Love Will Never Do (Without You)" video." American recording artist Nicole Scherzinger revealed that she was inspired by the video for her "Your Love" clip.

Live performances
Jackson has performed the song on most of her tours including the janet. Tour, The Velvet Rope Tour, All for You Tour, Rock Witchu Tour, Number Ones, Up Close and Personal, Unbreakable World Tour, and State of the World Tour. It was included on her 2019 Las Vegas Residency Janet Jackson: Metamorphosis.

Legacy
Sally Yeh and Alex To covered the Cantonese version "信自己" (Believe Myself) in 1991 on Sally 14th album. Macy Gray sang the song live as a tribute to Jackson during MTV's MTV Icon special in 2001. The song was recorded by Sahara Hotnights in 2009 on their album Sparks.
Manilyn Reynes performed the song on the film, Kung sino pa ang minahal (1991). Carnie Wilson revealed to Billboard that while creating a song for a Trident commercial as a task for The New Celebrity Apprentice it was inspired by this song.

Track listings

 Dutch 7-inch single (390 606-7)
 Work It Out" 7-inch With Intro – 4:48
 The Love 7-inch – 4:36

 UK 12-inch single (AMY 700) (limited edition with tour patch & sticker)Dutch 12-inch single (390 606-1)
 The "Work It Out" Mix – 7:30
 UK Funky Mix – 6:25
 The "Work It Out" Dub – 4:50

 UK CD single (AMCD 700)European CD single (390 606-2)U.S. CD single (75021 2400 2)
 Work It Out" 7-inch With Intro – 4:48
 Shep's "Work It Out" Mix – 7:37
 UK Funky Mix – 6:25

 U.S. 12-inch single (75021 2346 1)
 The "Work It Out" Mix – 7:30
 The "Work It Out" Dub – 4:51
 Work It Out" 7-inch With Intro – 4:48
 UK Funky Mix – 6:25
 UK Instrumental – 6:05
 Single Version – 4:30

 U.S. cassette single (75021-1538-4)
 Single Version – 4:30
 Work It Out" 7-inch With Intro – 4:48

 Japanese 3-inch CD single (PCDY-10021)
 Single Version – 4:30
 Work It Out" 7-inch With Intro – 4:48
 "The 1814 Megamix" – 7:24

 Japanese CD maxi-single' (PCCY-10164)
 Single Version – 4:30
 Work It Out" 7-inch With Intro – 4:48
 UK Funky 7-inch – 4:29
 The Love 7-inch – 4:36
 Work It Out" 7-inch – 4:13
 The "Work It Out" Mix – 7:30
 UK Funky Mix – 6:25
 Shep's Love Mix – 6:03
 The "Work It Out" Dub – 4:50
 The Love Dub – 6:07
 Shep's Original 7-inch – 4:28
 Acapella – 3:49
 "The 1814 Megamix" – 7:24
 "You Need Me" – 4:35

Charts

Weekly charts

Year-end charts

Certifications

|}

Release history

References

External links
 Herb Ritts

1989 songs
1990 singles
Janet Jackson songs
Billboard Hot 100 number-one singles
Cashbox number-one singles
MTV Video Music Award for Best Female Video
Music videos directed by Herb Ritts
Black-and-white music videos
Songs written by Jimmy Jam and Terry Lewis
RPM Top Singles number-one singles
Song recordings produced by Jimmy Jam and Terry Lewis
Sahara Hotnights songs
A&M Records singles
New jack swing songs